The AGO C.II was a German reconnaissance biplane of World War I. It was essentially a slightly redesigned version of the manufacturer's C.I design with a more powerful engine and 3-bay wings.

Two examples were equipped with floats (designation C.II-W) and operated by the Imperial German Navy for coastal patrol.

Operators

Luftstreitkräfte
Kaiserliche Marine

Specifications (AGO C.II (3-bay wings))

See also

References
Notes

Bibliography

External links

 Das Virtuelle Luftfahrtmuseum

C.II
AGO C.02
Military aircraft of World War I
Single-engined pusher aircraft
Aircraft first flown in 1915

de:AGO C.I-III